The Yugoslavia national under-21 football team existed in the Socialist Federal Republic of Yugoslavia. After the state's dissolution in 1992, the following teams were formed:
Bosnia and Herzegovina national under-21 football team
Croatia national under-21 football team
North Macedonia national under-21 football team
Kosovo national under-21 football team
Slovenia national under-21 football team
FR Yugoslavia national under-21 football team
Serbia national under-21 football team
Montenegro national under-21 football team

Following the realignment of UEFA's youth competitions in 1976, Yugoslavia's Under-21 team was formed. The team had a varied record, reaching the last four in four tournaments and failing to qualify for four. Yugoslavia won the inaugural competition in 1978. Since the under-21 competition rules insist that players must be 21 or under at the start of a two-year competition, technically it is an U-23 competition.  Yugoslavia's record in U-23 competitions is also shown.

UEFA European Under-23 Challenge Cup
Yugoslavia were randomly chosen to play holders Bulgaria for the title, which they won.  They then faced (and beat) other randomly chosen teams until the competition was abandoned in summer 1970 for a larger competition.

 October 26, 1968: Bulgaria 1–2 Yugoslavia
 June 6, 1969: Yugoslavia 3–0 Spain
 November 6, 1969: Yugoslavia 2–0 Sweden
 March 24, 1970: Greece 1–5 Yugoslavia

 1972: Did not qualify. Finished 2nd of 3 in qualification group.
 1974: Did not qualify. Finished 2nd of 3 in qualification group.
 1976: Losing semi-finalists.

This was competed for on a basis similar to a boxing title belt. The holders played a randomly chosen opponent for the championship.

UEFA U-21 Championship record 
 1978: Winners.
 1980: Losing semi-finalists.
 1982: Did not qualify. Finished 2nd of 3 in qualification group.
 1984: Losing semi-finalists.
 1986: Did not qualify. Finished 4th of 4 in qualification group.
 1988: Did not qualify. Finished 3rd of 3 in qualification group.
 1990: Runners-up.
 1992: Did not qualify. Finished 2nd of 4 in qualification group.

See also 
 European Under-21 Football Championship

External links
 UEFA Under-21 website Contains full results archive
 The Rec.Sport.Soccer Statistics Foundation Contains full record of U-21/U-23 Championships.

European national under-21 association football teams
under